Olaf Feldmann (born 9 May 1937) was a German politician of the Free Democratic Party (FDP) and former member of the German Bundestag.

Life 
On 29 January 1981 Feldmann joined the German Bundestag, where he sat as a member of parliament until 1998. He was the spokesman for tourism and disarmament policy of the FDP parliamentary group and deputy chairman of the Sports Committee.

Literature

References

1937 births
Members of the Bundestag for Baden-Württemberg
Members of the Bundestag 1994–1998
Members of the Bundestag 1990–1994
Members of the Bundestag 1987–1990
Members of the Bundestag 1983–1987
Members of the Bundestag 1980–1983
Members of the Bundestag for the Free Democratic Party (Germany)
Living people